Kanaklal Barua (1872–1940) was a prominent writer, essayist, historian and politician from Assam who wrote mainly in the English language. He was one of the literary stalwarts of the Jonaki Era, the age of romanticism of Assamese literature. He was the president of the Asam Sahitya Sabha in 1924 held at Dibrugarh district, Assam. In 1929 he was elected to Assam Legislative Assembly. He also served as a member of the Viceroy's Executive Council. He was the founder president of the Kamarupa Anusandhan Samiti (Assam Research Society). He was rewarded with the "Raibahadur" title by the British Government.

Works
His books include Studies in the Early History of Assam, An Early History of Kamarupa From the Earliest Time to the Sixteenth Century and Manual of Co-operative Societies in Assam. He was also an editor of the Jonaki magazine for some months.

See also
 Assamese literature
 History of Assamese literature
 List of Asam Sahitya Sabha presidents
 List of Assamese writers with their pen names

References

External links
 Among the Luminaries in Assam: A Study of Assamese Biography, by Anjali Sarma.
 Few historical article's by Kalaklal Barua at Discovery of North-East India: Geography, History, Culture ..., Volume 3 edited by Suresh Kant Sharma, Usha Sharma.
 A statue of Kalaklal Barua
 Kalaklal Barua at OLCC WorldCat Identities

Barua, Kalaklal
Asom Sahitya Sabha Presidents
Assam politicians
1872 births
1940 deaths
20th-century Indian historians